Saccoglossus      is a genus of acorn worm (Class Enteropneusta). It is the largest genus in this class, with 18 species.

This genus is characterized especially by the concentric rings of muscle fibers in the proboscis. Many Saccoglossus can be found in coastal mud and sand habitat, often near bays. They dig tubes in the substrate, ejecting conical piles of castings in a spiral fashion.

Acorn worms of this genus are known for the production and accumulation of various halogenated phenols and pyrroles.

Species

Species include:
 Saccoglossus apatensis Thomas, 1956
 Saccoglossus aulakoeis Thomas, 1968
 Saccoglossus bromophenolosus King, Giray and Kornfield, 1994
 Saccoglossus horsti Brambell and Goodhart, 1941
 Saccoglossus hwangtauensis Si & Kwang-Chung, 1935
 Saccoglossus inhacensis van der Horst, 1934
 Saccoglossus kowalevskii (Agassiz, 1873)
 Saccoglossus madrasensis Rao, 1957
 Saccoglossus mereschkowskii (Wagner, 1885)
 Saccoglossus otagoensis (Benham, 1899)
 Saccoglossus palmeri Cameron, et al., 2010
 Saccoglossus porochordus Cameron, et al., 2010
 Saccoglossus pusillus (Ritter, 1902)
 Saccoglossus rhabdorhynchus Cameron, et al., 2010
 Saccoglossus ruber Tattersall, 1905
 Saccoglossus shumaginensis Cameron, et al., 2010
 Saccoglossus sonorensis Cameron, et al., 2010
 Saccoglossus sulcatus (Spengel, 1893)

References

Enteropneusta